Public Enemy Returns is a 2008 South Korean film directed by Kang Woo-suk. It is the sequel to Public Enemy (2002) and Another Public Enemy (2005), also directed by Kang.

2007 was a poor year for South Korean cinema, largely due to the reduced screen quota from 146 to 73 days as part of the 2007 free trade agreement between the US and South Korea. This resulted in production costs rising, a series of box office failures, and the number of Korean films sold overseas dropping. During May 2008, only 7.8% of films shown in South Korea were Korean, the lowest level since records began in 2000. It was hoped that the Korean film industry might rally behind Public Enemy Returns. The film sold 4,337,983 tickets nationwide and was the 4th most attended film of 2008.

Synopsis
In debt and out of money, Kang Chul-joong (Sol Kyung-gu) is tired of being a cop and looking to retire. But his boss gives him one last case, an investigation of the president of Geo Seong Enterprises, Lee Won-sool (Jung Jae-young), and some recent murders.

Cast
 Sol Kyung-gu as Kang Chul-joong
 Jung Jae-young as Lee Won-sool
 Kang Shin-il as Squad chief Uhm
 Lee Moon-sik as An-soo
 Yoo Hae-jin as Yong-man
 Kim Jeong-hak as Detective Kim
 Kim Nam-gil (credited as Lee Han) as Mun-su
 Moon Sung-keun as Tae-san
 Lee Min-ho as Jung Ha-yeon

Awards and nominations
2008 Blue Dragon Film Awards
 Nomination - Best Actor - Sol Kyung-gu
 Nomination - Best New Actor - Kim Nam-gil

2008 Korean Film Awards
 Nomination - Best Supporting Actor - Kang Shin-il

2009 Baeksang Arts Awards
 Grand Prize for Film - Kang Woo-suk
 Nomination - Best Director - Kang Woo-suk
 Nomination - Best Actor - Sol Kyung-gu
 Nomination - Best Screenplay - Jang Jin

References

External links
  
 
 
 

Films directed by Kang Woo-suk
2008 films
2000s crime action films
Police detective films
South Korean crime action films
Films about organized crime in South Korea
2000s Korean-language films
CJ Entertainment films
Cinema Service films
2000s South Korean films